Loxosceles adelaida is a species of venomous recluse spider found in South America.

L. adelaida inhabits mainly in caves, but has also been reported in forests adjacent to caves in Brazil. A recent study on the biological activity of venom of this species proved that it has a similar potential to induce hemolysis, dermonecrosis and lethality that L. gaucho, its venom produced a component of 31 kDa, endowed with hemolytic and dermonecrotic activities, therefore it has the potential to cause serious accidents as well as synanthropic species.

References 

Spiders of Brazil
Sicariidae
Spiders described in 1967